Keratin 9 is a protein that in humans is encoded by the KRT9 gene.

Keratin 9 is a type I cytokeratin. It is found only in the terminally differentiated epidermis of palms and soles. Mutations in the gene encoding this protein cause epidermolytic palmoplantar keratoderma.

References

Further reading

Keratins